The Napa Open is a defunct tennis tournament that was played on the Grand Prix tennis circuit in 1981. The event was held in Napa, California and was played on outdoor hard courts.  Sammy Giammalva, Jr. won the singles title while Chris Mayotte and Richard Meyer partnered to win the doubles title.

Finals

Singles

Doubles

External links
 ITF tournament details
 ATP tournament results

Defunct tennis tournaments in the United States
Grand Prix tennis circuit
Hard court tennis tournaments in the United States
ATP Tour
Sports in the San Francisco Bay Area